Amu is a Southern Loloish language of Mojiang Hani Autonomous County, Yunnan, China.

Yang Meiqiong (2014) contains a vocabulary and phrase list of Amu transcribed using Hani orthography.

Distribution
In Mojiang County, Amu is spoken by a total of 7,050 people in the following townships (Yang & Zhang 2010:9).

Sinanjiang Township 泗南江乡 (4,001 persons), with more than half of all Amu living in Qian'gang Village 千岗村 and Ganba Village 干坝村 according to Yang (2014:1).
Longtan Township 龙潭乡 (998 persons)
Baliu Township 坝溜乡 (945 persons)
Yayi Township 雅邑乡 (451 persons)
Wenwu Township 文武乡 (125 persons)

References

Yang Hong [杨洪], Zhang Hong [张红]. 2010. Demographics and current situations of Hani subgroups in Mojiang County [墨江哈尼族自治县哈尼支系与人口现状调查研究]. Journal of Honghe University [红河学院学报]. Vol. 8, No. 3. Jun. 2010. 
Yang Meiqiong [杨美琼]. 2014. Wenhua shiying yu shehui bianqian - Mojiang Hanizu Amu zhixi wenhua shizheng [文化适应于社会变迁-墨江哈尼族阿木支系文化实证]. Kunming: Yunnan Arts Press [云南美朮出版社]. 
You Weiqiong [尤伟琼]. 2013. Classifying ethnic groups of Yunnan [云南民族识别研究]. Beijing: Nationalities Press [民族出版社].

Southern Loloish languages
Languages of Yunnan